The National Center for Trauma-Informed Care is a United States based medical charity, funded by the Center for Mental Health Services (CMHS). Created in 2005, it assists publicly funded agencies, programs, and services in making a cultural shift to a more trauma-informed environment — an environment intended to be more supportive, comprehensively integrated, and empowering for trauma survivors. The website for Trauma-Informed Care, Implementation Resource Center can be accessed at https://www.traumainformedcare.chcs.org/.

Trauma-Informed Healing: A Vital Turning Point in Public Health Services
Nobody understands the journey of healing from trauma better than the person living it. Consumers and survivors of violence and trauma know their history, struggles, means of survival and coping, and what promotes healing, better than anyone else. Consumers and survivors frequently encounter services that mirror the power and control experienced in past abusive relationships that caused the trauma. In the traditional program of services, healing and recovery is difficult and the risk of retraumatization is real.

By contrast, trauma-informed policies and services work for both the person seeking services AND for the provider. Providers in a trauma informed environment have emerged as partners to guide and support those who seek services, while also taking time out to engage in self-care practices that help to manage the stresses linked to their own past traumas and possible compassion fatigue.

Consumers as partners in this same environment have emerged as leaders in their own healing, as peer supporters, as peer counselors, as advocates providing leadership in state consumer and peer networks, and as entrepreneurs in developing new employment initiatives.

Paths to Healing

“Trauma-informed” is based on the understanding that the impact of violent experiences and damaging relationships affects not only the survivor’s physical, mental, emotional, and economic well-being, but the spiritual as well. Trauma’s isolating impact makes relationships more difficult. Talking about what happened may feel too vulnerable and risky. Removing the weight of trauma from the soul isn’t easy. But healing often arises when other creative forms of expression are embraced. New connections and relationships are forged – and without the limitations of communicating solely through language.

Healing can be inspired through contact with the various arts such as creative writing, journaling, making music, visual expressions, and more. In many ways, whatever the art medium used, personal anonymity and room to communicate and interpret experience through the expression of art can give the survivor real freedom in telling their story. Exploring their trauma in this way, survivors may experience shifts in physiology (from stress to relaxation) and attitude (from fear to creative inspiration). This can be a part of taking care of the self and the soul – of staying grounded – of finding oneself when feeling lost. In these creative outlets, survivors can find renewed faith, humor, hope, and optimism.

Trauma-Informed   -   Healing Partnerships for Revolutionary Change

Rooted in the understanding that trauma is a fundamental issue for many people seeking mental health and other public health services, the Center for Mental Health Services (CMHS) National Center for Trauma-Informed Care (NCTIC) provides consultation, technical assistance, and training to revolutionize the way mental health and public health services are organized, delivered, and managed through trauma-informed change. Supporting this shift is the focus of NCTIC’s work, providing useful support in helping providers move from caretaker to collaborator, and empowering the consumer and survivor with voice and choice. Trauma-informed care involves not only changing assumptions about how we organize and provide services, but also creating organizational cultures that are personal, creative, open, and healing. By facilitating healing through trauma-informed care, health risk behaviors that stem from unaddressed trauma can be prevented, which promotes overall self and community wellness.

NCTIC is dedicated to the proposition that, with a better integration of trauma into public health services, more trauma survivors and consumers will find their path to healing and wellness. Especially in settings where trauma services are already available, if these services are provided in a context of an agency that has not adopted a trauma-informed management and training orientation, then the effectiveness of the trauma services actually offered can be undercut. They believe that, with a greater public commitment to trauma-informed programs and systems for survivors, a wide range of health, behavioral health, and social problems will be lessened for generations to come.

NCTIC is funded by the U.S. Department of Health and Human Services, Substance Abuse and Mental Health Services Administration, Center for Mental Health Services under contract HHSS2832007000201 to the National Association of State Mental Health Program Directors.

External links
 SAMHSA's page on NCTIC

References
https://focus.psychiatryonline.org/doi/10.1176/appi.focus.20190027

Mental health organizations in Maryland
Educational organizations based in the United States